Bangladesh–India relations are the bilateral relations between the People’s Republic of Bangladesh and the Republic of India, both of which are South Asian neighbours. Diplomatic relations between the two countries formally began in 1971 with India's recognition of an independent Bangladesh (which was formerly known as East Pakistan).

The relations between the two countries have been characterised as a special relationship although some disputes remain unresolved. The historic land boundary agreement was signed on 6 June 2015 which settled decades old border disputes, while negotiations are still ongoing over the sharing of water of the transboundary rivers. In recent years, Bangladesh has seen rising anti-India sentiments among its citizens due to the Indian government's perceived anti-Muslim and anti-Bangladeshi activities like India's interference in Bangladeshi politics, killings of Bangladeshis by Indian BSF, Citizenship Amendment Act, rise of Hindutva in India as well as India's reluctance in solving the water disputes in common rivers with Bangladesh. In 2019, several Bangladeshi ministers canceled their scheduled state visits to India as a response to India's Citizenship Amendment Bill. In 2021, massive protests in Bangladesh against the state visit by Indian PM Narendra Modi to the country led to the deaths of at least 14 people.

Bangladesh and India are common members of SAARC, BIMSTEC, IORA and the Commonwealth. The two countries share many cultural ties. In particular, Bangladesh and the east Indian state of West Bengal are Bengali-speaking. In 1971, the Bangladesh Liberation War broke out between East Pakistan and West Pakistan; India intervened in December 1971 in support of East Pakistan and helped secure its independence from Pakistan as the country of Bangladesh. Since the visit of Indian Prime Minister Narendra Modi to Bangladesh in 2015 and round back visit of Bangladeshi Prime Minister Sheikh Hasina to India in 2017, the notable developments that have taken places include resolution of long-pending land and maritime boundaries asserting the issue of enclaves, conclusion of over ninety instruments comprising in the hi-tech areas, i.e., electronics, cyber-security, space, information technology, and civil nuclear energy and observed increase in bilateral trade from US$9 billion to US$10.46 billion in the fiscal year (FY) 2018–19, preceded by US$7 billion to US$9 billion in FY 2017–18, an increase of 28.5 percent.

On 6 December, Bangladesh and India celebrate Friendship Day commemorating India's recognition of Bangladesh and the continued friendship between the two countries.

History 
India's links with Bangladesh are civilizational, cultural, social, and economic. There is much that unites the two countries – a shared history and common heritage, linguistic and cultural ties, passion for music, literature and the arts.

Also, Rabindranath Tagore, the Bengali-Indian Polymath created the national anthems of both Bangladesh and India in 1905 and 1911 respectively. The two nations were strong allies during the Bangladesh Liberation War in 1971. From the mid-1970s, however, relations worsened because Bangladesh developed closer ties with Islamic nations, participated in the Organization of the Islamic Conference, and increased emphasis on Islamic identity over the country's ethnolinguistic roots. The two countries developed different Cold War alliances in the 1980s, which further chilled bilateral relations. With the onset of economic liberalization in South Asia, they forged greater bilateral engagement and trade. The historic Ganges Water Sharing Treaty was concluded in 1996. India and Bangladesh are close strategic partners in counter-terrorism. They are also the largest trading partners in South Asia.

Areas of contention

 A major area of contention has been the construction and operation of the Farakka Barrage by India to increase water supply in the River Hooghly. Bangladesh insists that it does not receive a fair share of the Ganges waters during the drier seasons, and gets flooded during the monsoons when India releases excess waters. See also Sharing of Ganges Waters.
 There have also been disputes regarding the transfer of Teen Bigha Corridor to Bangladesh. Part of Bangladesh is surrounded by the Indian state of West Bengal. On 26 June 1992, India leased three bigha land to Bangladesh to connect this enclave with mainland Bangladesh. There was a dispute regarding the indefinite nature of the lease. The dispute was resolved by a mutual agreement between India and Bangladesh in 2011.
 Terrorist activities carried out by outfits based in both countries, like Banga Sena and Harkat-ul-Jihad-al-Islami. Recently India and Bangladesh had agreed jointly to fight terrorism.
 Bangladesh has consistently denied India transit facility to the landlocked North Eastern Regions of India. Although India has a narrow land link to this North Eastern region, which is famously known as the Siliguri Corridor or "India's Chicken Neck", less than 27 kilometers (17 mi) wide, remained as the only bridge between the northeastern part of India and the rest of the country.
 Illegal Bangladeshi immigration into India. The border is porous and migrants are able to cross illegally, though sometimes only in return for financial or other incentives to border security personnel. Bangladeshi officials have denied the existence of Bangladeshis living in India and those illegal migrants found are described as having been trafficked. This has considerable repercussions for those involved, as they are stigmatized for having been involved in prostitution, whether or not this has actually been the case. Cross border migrants are also at far higher risk of HIV/AIDS infection.
 Continuous border killing of Bangladeshi people by Indian border guards, aiding illegal immigrants, helping in armed dacoity, fake money transfer and illegal drug trades by both Indian and Bangladeshi people are the major problems between Bangladesh and India.
 Both Bangladesh and India made claims over the same seawater at the Bay of Bengal before settlement of the issue.
 There was a minor glitch in their relation when former Indian Prime Minister Dr. Manmohan Singh accidentally mentioned that 25% of Bangladeshis are anti-Indian, during an informal press meet.

Border killings

Deaths of Bangladeshi citizens in the Indo-Bangladesh border became one of the embarrassments between the two nation's bilateral relations in recent years. The so-called 'shoot-to-kill' policy by India's Border Security Forces (BSF) that according to Human Rights Watch killed nearly 1,000 Bangladeshis between 2001 and 2011 has remained at the core of the talks between Bangladeshi and Indian officials visiting each other.

Indian officials visiting Bangladesh including the Indian foreign ministers and BSF chiefs numerously vowed to stop BSF shootings, but Bangladeshi nationals, comprising mostly illicit border crossers, have continued to be shot dead by the Indian troops.

While anger grew in Bangladesh because of the continued BSF shootings and subsequent deaths, Indian officials argue that heightened security has followed the increasing flow of illegal migrations into India as well as continued misuse of the border by illicit traders. Indian officials, vowing to cut down the number of casualties at border, showed statistics that the number of Bangladeshi deaths was in a steady decline in recent years.

The Bangladeshi deaths caused by BSF shootings at the border became subject to a so-called cyber war between the hackers of the two countries that took the websites of BSF, National Informatics Centre and Trinamool Congress as victims. The government of Bangladesh was found to comment on the issue condemning the cyber attacks on Indian websites.

Border police often shoots to kill any illegal immigrants crossing the border. Human Rights Watch estimates say 1,000 people were killed in the area between 2001 and 2011 by Indian border security force BSF.

Recent developments

In September 2011, the two countries signed a major accord on border demarcation to end the 4-decade old disputes over boundaries. This came to be known as the Tin Bigha corridor. India also granted 24-hour access to Bangladeshi citizens in the Tin Bigha Corridor. The agreement included exchange of adversely held enclaves, involving 51,000 people spread over 111 Indian enclaves in Bangladesh and 51 Bangladeshi enclaves in India. The total land involved is over 24,000 acres.

On 9 October 2011, Indian and Bangladeshi armies participated in Sampriti-II (Unity-II), a 14-day-long Joint military exercise at Sylhet to increase synergy between their forces.

In 2012, Bangladesh allowed India's Oil and Natural Gas Corporation to ferry heavy machinery, turbines and cargo through Ashuganj for Palatana Power project in southern Tripura.

From October 2013, India started exporting 500 megawatts of electricity a day to Bangladesh over a period of 35 years. A 125-kilometre Baharampur-Bheramara transmission line, 40 km of it in Bangladesh, connects the two substations. Bangladesh officials believe the export would greatly ease the national shortage once 500 MW flows into the national grid. The two country's Prime Ministers also unveiled the plaque of the 1,320-MW coal-fired Rampal power plant, a joint venture between the two countries. The link is being seen as a major milestone in strengthening the bilateral relationship and comes at a time when India is desperate to make up for its inability to deliver on two key pacts with Bangladesh: one on Teesta waters and the land boundary pact.

From November 2013, A Wagah Border-like ceremony is being organized at Petrapole (in West Bengal, India) - Benapole (Bangladesh) border checkpoint. The ceremony which includes parades, march-past and lowering of the national flag of both the countries is now a daily routine, at sundown, on the eastern border. The relations between the countries are definitely moving in positive direction.

Indian External Affairs Minister Sushma Swaraj visited Bangladesh in her first official overseas trip in June, 2014. On 7 May 2015 the Indian Parliament, in the presence of Bangladeshi diplomats, unanimously passed the Land Boundary Agreement (LBA) as its 100th Constitutional amendment, thereby resolving all 68-year-old border disputes since the end of the British Raj. The bill was pending ratification since the 1974 Mujib-Indira accords.

In June 2014, during her first official overseas visit, Foreign Minister of India, Sushma Swaraj concluded various agreements to boost ties. They include:
 Easing of Visa regime to provide 5-year multiple entry visas to minors below 13 and elderly above 65.
 Proposal of a special economic zone in Bangladesh.
 Agreement to send back a fugitive accused of murder in India.
 Provide an additional 100 MW power from Tripura.
 Increase the frequency of Maitree Express and start buses between Dhaka and Guwahati and Shillong.
 Bangladesh allowed India to ferry food and grains to the landlocked Northeast India's using its territory and infrastructure.

During Indian Prime Minister Narendra Modi's state visit to Bangladesh during June 2015 as many as 22 agreements were signed by two sides. During the visit India extended a US$2 billion line of credit to Bangladesh & pledged US$5 billion worth of investments. As per the agreements, India's Reliance Power agreed to invest US$3 billion to set up a 3,000 MW LNG-based power plant (which is the single largest foreign investment ever made in Bangladesh). Adani Power will also be setting up a 1600 MW coal-fired power plant at a cost of US$1.5 billion. The two countries signed a total of 22 agreements including the ones on maritime safety co-operation and curbing human trafficking and fake Indian currency. Modi also announced a line of credit of $2 billion to Bangladesh.

At midnight on 31 July 2015, around 50,000 people became citizens of India or Bangladesh after living in limbo for decades. Ending a prolonged dispute, the two nations swapped 162 enclaves on the border region, allowing the people living there to stay or opt out to the other country. While 14,214 citizens of Bangladesh residing in 51 enclaves on the Indian side became Indians, a large number of people in the 111 Indian enclaves in Bangladesh preferred to stay with Bangladesh and just 979 opted to move to India. The total number of new Indian citizens will be 15,193.

In November 2015, Bangladeshi Commerce Minister Tofail Ahmed was critical of India's 2015 Nepal blockade, stating that "blockades hit at agreements like the BBIN".

In 2018, the leaders of both the countries inaugurated the 130 km long Bangladesh-India Friendship pipeline to supply 4 lakh tonnes of diesel to Bangladesh. In September 2018, the Bangladesh cabinet approved the draft of a proposed agreement with India to allow it to use the Chittagong and Mongla sea ports for transporting goods to and from its land-locked northeastern states.

In 2019, the Indian Parliament passed the Citizenship Amendment Act (CAA), following which Bangladesh's Foreign Minister AK Abdul Momen and Home Minister Asaduzzaman Khan cancelled their trips to India. Later, minister Shahriar Alam also cancelled his visit to India. Bangladeshi Prime Minister Sheikh Hasina was critical of the CAA, describing it as "not necessary", but nevertheless affirmed CAA and the National Register of Citizens were "internal matters" of India.

Defence relations

During Sheikh Hasina's four-day visit to New Delhi in April 2017, Bangladesh and India signed two defence agreements, the first such agreements between India and any of its neighbors. Under the agreements, the militaries of the two countries will conduct joint exercises and training. India will help Bangladesh set up manufacturing and service centres for defence platforms that both countries possess with the aim of achieving self-sufficiency in defence manufacturing in Bangladesh, and will also provide the Bangladesh military with expert training, and technical and logistic support. India also extended its first ever defence-related line of credit to a neighboring country, by providing Bangladesh with $500 million to purchase defence equipment.

Also, the militaries of the two countries have played quite an extensive role in taking up common issues to enhance and conduct training programmes to deal with counter terrorism issues, natural disasters, ensure Humanitarian Assistance and Disaster Reliefs (HADR). Very, recent in March 2019, Indian Army's current Chief of Staff, then as GOC-in-C of the Eastern Army Command, General M.M. Naravane visited to the Chief of Army Staff, of Bangladesh, General Aziz Ahmed to hold talks related to boosting of Intelligence sharing between the 2 countries along with developing other areas of defence cooperation. The visit has most importantly come up at the time, when Myanmar decided to take strong actions in order to act against the operating insurgent groups which were operating foiling up terrorist activities on both the sides of India and Myanmar, along with that had discussions on various options to enhance the conduction of Military exercises at a more rapid and strong scale.

Prime Minister Narendra Modi said, that;  India would not like to impose anything which Bangladesh may find not suitable to its requirement. The bilateral document under consideration is aimed at institutionalizing the existing mechanism and streamlining the ongoing cooperation between both the countries", an official said, adding maritime security will be a key element in the partnership with the two countries facing similar challenges in the Bay of Bengal zone. A joint road-map for developing Blue Economy in Bay of Bengal is likely to be unveiled during Prime Minister Hasina's visit.  
Also, both Prime Ministers of India and Bangladesh, had welcomed their initiatives for developing a closer effort to strengthen Maritime Security Partnerships and also they appreciated the Finalization of a Memorandum of Understanding (MoU) related to the establishment of a Coastal Surveillance Radar System in Bangladesh's Chittagong and Mongla Ports.

Border security management 

During the state visit by Prime Minister Sheikh Hasina to New Delhi in 2019, had a talk with Prime Minister Narendra Modi, where he appreciated the zero-tolerance policy of the government of Bangladesh's resolute effort towards ensuring peace, security and stability in the entire region and also it was recognized by both the leaders, that terrorism yet remains as one of the major significant threads to the levels of peace and stability of both the countries and the regions. However, the Prime Ministers of the two nations had entrusted and reiterated their faith and strong commitment in order to eliminate in all its forms of manifestations and stressed of the fact of avoiding terror. Also, both the Prime Ministers had referred to the successful discussions between the Home Ministers of both Bangladesh and India during the visit made by the Home Minister of Bangladesh to India in August 2019, whereby he agreed for a closer cooperation to fight against extremist radical groups, terrorist organisations, smuggling of arms, drugs and fake currency and also organized crime as a shared priority.

Energy cooperation

India has recently introduced the concept of the Regional Power Trading System which will help various regions of the country in reducing the power deficit by transferring surplus power from another region. Under the Electricity Act 2003, the Indian companies could pool power in an exchange. A consumer would be free to buy it from anyone. This concept of power pool within India can also be enlarged to cover the neighboring countries like Bangladesh, Bhutan and Nepal after the establishment of a sub-regional power pool and necessary inter-connections among these countries are put in place. This can ultimately form a regional power pool thereby generating a huge opportunity for power trading in the region.

India is also looking to export electricity from its north-eastern region with potential to generate some 58,971 MW to its eastern States through Bangladesh. Bangladesh hopes to have access to Nepal and Bhutan's power through India. Bangladesh has formally requested a ‘power corridor’ to access the Bhutanese and Nepalese markets. It has agreed to allow India to transfer hydroelectricity from Assam to Bihar through its territory. The proposed meeting would attempt to remove irritants in project-related areas. In 2016 deal between Prime Minister Narendra Modi and Prime Minister Sheikh Hasina was criticized. Bangladeshi critics accused the deal for setting a high price for the import of electricity, especially from Tripura. Equipment for the plant was sent through Bangladesh which waived most of the transit fees.
Adani Power said on 8 November 2017 its arm Adani Power (Jharkhand) has inked long-term pact with Bangladesh Power Development Board to supply electricity from its upcoming 1,600 MW plant at Godda in Jharkhand.

High level visits

President Ershad visited India in 1982. Prime Minister Sheikh Hasina visited India in 2010 to sign number of deals. Indian Prime Minister Manmohan Singh visited Dhaka in 2011 to sign number of deals. Prime Minister Narendra Modi visited Bangladesh which was historic as land boundary agreement was solved in 2015.

Economic activity
Bangladesh-India bilateral trade was over US$10 billion in 2018–19.

Loans

In 2011, India approved a $750 million loan for developing Bangladesh infrastructure and offered another $1 billion soft loan for infrastructure development in 2014.

Scholarships

Every year 200 Bangladeshi students receive ICCR scholarships. India has offered scholarships for meritorious Bangladeshi under and post graduate students and PhD researchers to undertake studies in traditional systems of medicines like Ayurveda, Unani and Homeopathy, according to Indian High Commission in Dhaka. In 2017, 400 Indian medical students protested in Chittagong after they failed to register with the Bangladesh Medical and Dental Council.

Trade and investment

The trade is set to go at $10 billion by 2018 through ports. Bilateral trade between India and Bangladesh stood at US$6.6 billion in 2013–14 with India's exports at US$6.1 billion and imports from Bangladesh at US$462 million, representing more than double the value of US$2.7 billion five years ago.

Bangladesh Cabinet has approved a revised trade deal with India under which the two nations would be able to use each other's land and water routes for sending goods to a third country, removing a long-standing barrier in regional trade. Under the deal India would also be able to send goods to Myanmar through Bangladesh. It incorporated a provision that the deal would be renewed automatically after five years if neither of the countries did not have any objection.

During the recent state visit by Prime Minister Sheikh Hasina to New Delhi in September 2022, she has urged with Indian businesses to invest in her nation's burgeoning manufacturing, energy, and transportation sectors, as well as its infrastructure projects. In his response to her invitation, CII President Sanjiv Bajaj discussed energy and infrastructure, as well as the ways in which connectivity can be utilized to promote shared prosperity. He went on to say that "India's experience with Digital India ought to be utilized in order to better sync it with Digital Bangladesh in order to provide more opportunities for digital and financial inclusion."

COVID-19 pandemic cooperation
Bangladesh started mass COVID-19 vaccinations with India's Serum Institute Covishield vaccines on 7 February 2021. Bangladesh procured 7 million doses and India had meant to gift a further 3.3 million doses.  Due to a second wave of COVID-19 in India, the vaccine export was halted. It hampered the vaccination program in Bangladesh.

In April 2021, Bangladesh sent medicines and medical equipment to India following the deteriorating COVID-19 situation in India. The relief package consisted of approximately 10,000 vials of Remdesivir, (produced in Bangladesh by Beximco) anti-viral injections, oral anti-viral, 30,000 PPE kits, and several thousand zinc, calcium, vitamin C and other necessary tablets. In May 2021, the government of Bangladesh sent a second consignment of COVID-19 relief consisting of antibiotics, paracetamol, protective equipment and hand sanitiser.

See also

 Bangladesh–India border
 Indians in Bangladesh
 Bangladeshis in India 
 Foreign relations of Bangladesh
 Foreign relations of India
 South Asian Association for Regional Cooperation (SAARC)

References

Further reading
 Malone, David M., C. Raja Mohan, and Srinath Raghavan, eds. The Oxford handbook of Indian foreign policy (2015) excerpt pp 384–397.

External links
 Map of India-Bangladesh border links

 
India
Bilateral relations of India
Bangladesh and the Commonwealth of Nations
India and the Commonwealth of Nations